Sam Ashworth may refer to:
 Samuel Ashworth (1877–1925), English footballer
 Sam Ashworth (songwriter), American songwriter